The bluespotted tuskfish (Choerodon cauteroma) is a species of wrasse native to the coastal waters of northwestern Australia. They occur in reef environments, preferring areas with sandy substrates or weedy growth.

References 

bluespotted tuskfish
Marine fish of Western Australia 
Fauna of Western Australia 
bluespotted tuskfish
Taxonomy articles created by Polbot